Fang Zhong (born July 1970) is a Chinese physicist and the current director of the Institute of Physics, Chinese Academy of Sciences.

Biography
Fang was born in Wuhan, Hubei province in 1970. He received his bachelor's degree and doctor's degree from Huazhong University of Science and Technology in 1991 and 1996, respectively.

After university, he became a visiting scholar at the Industrial Technology Research Institute in Japan and Oak Ridge National Laboratory in the United States. He returned to China in 2003 and became a research follow at the Institute of Physics, Chinese Academy of Sciences in Beijing. He served as deputy director of the Institute of Physics, Chinese Academy of Sciences in 2012, and five years later promoted to the Director position. On November 21, 2017, he was appointed director of the Beijing National Research Center for Condensed Matter Physics.

Honours and awards
 2008 Mao Yisheng Youth Science and Technology Award; ICTP Award of the International Centre for Theoretical Physics (ICTP)
 2010 C. N. YangAward of the Asia Pacific Federation of physical Societies
 2011 Fellow of the American Physical Society (APS)
 2012 Asia Achievement Award of the Global Chinese Physics Society
 2013 Zhou Peiyuan Physics Award
 November 22, 2019 Academician of the Chinese Academy of Sciences (CAS)

References

External links
 Biography of Fang Zhong on Key Laboratory of Condensed Matter Theory and Computation, Institute of Physics, Chinese Academy of Sciences

1970 births
People from Wuhan
Living people
Huazhong University of Science and Technology alumni
Physicists from Hubei
Members of the Chinese Academy of Sciences
Fellows of the American Physical Society